David Neves (14 May 1938 – 23 November 1994) was a Brazilian film director and screenwriter. He directed nine films between 1964 and 1988. He was a member of the jury at the 20th Berlin International Film Festival in 1970.

Selected filmography
 Garrincha: Hero of the Jungle (1962 - writer)
 Luz del Fuego (1982 - director)

References

External links

1938 births
1994 deaths
Writers from Rio de Janeiro (city)
Brazilian film directors
Brazilian screenwriters
20th-century screenwriters